Fresno City may refer to:
Fresno City, California
Fresno City College